Arundhati Holme Chowdhury, also spelt as Arundhati Holme (Hom) Choudhury, is a Bengali Indian exponent of Rabindra Sangeet and Bengali songs. She has worked as a playback singer mostly in Bengali-language films.

Selected filmography 

Dadar Kirti (1980)
Pathbhola (1986)
Bidrohi (1987)
Gayak (1987)
Anjali (1988)
Chhoto Bou (1988)
Aagaman (1988)
Shatarupa (1989)
Byabadhan (1990)
Path O Prasad (1991)
Abhagini (1991)
Neelimay Neel (1991)
Nabab (1991)
Indrajit (1992)
Surer Bhubane (1992)
Prithibir Shesh Station (1993)
Maya Mamata (1993)
Shilpi (1994)
Kothachilo (1994)
Geet Sangeet (1994)
Kakababu Here Gelen? (1995)
Puja (1996)
Naach Nagini Naach Re (1996)
Mukhyamantri (1996)
Damu (1996)
Himghar (1996)
Baro Bou (1997)
Alo (2003)

Selected albums 

 Kumud Kavya Geeti (1983)
 Hridayer Eto Gaan (1991)
 Mor Bina Kon Sure Baji (2004)
 Mone Pare (2010)
 Tomari Smriti Sudhaye (2020)

Awards 

 Several BFJA Awards including Best Female Playback Singer in 1975, 1986 and 2007
 Anandalok Puraskar (2004) 
Banga Bhushan (2018)

See also 
 List of Indian playback singers
 Bengal Film Journalists' Association – Best Female Playback Award
Prabhat Samgiita

References

External links 
Arundhati Holme Chowdhury gaana.com

htt

Bengali singers
Bengali playback singers
Rabindra Sangeet exponents
Indian playback singers
Year of birth missing (living people) 
Singers from West Bengal
Living people

p://salilda.com/nonfilmsongs/arundhati.asp